Op hoop van zegen is a 1924 Dutch silent drama film directed by James Bauer and Henk Kleinmann.

Cast
 Adele Sandrock - Kniertje
 Hans Adalbert Schlettow - Geert
 Erwin Biswanger - Bos
 Paula Batzer - Clementine
 Werner Funck - Reder Bos
 Joseph Klein - Simon
 Lotte Steinhoff
 Barbara von Annenkoff - Jo

External links 
 

1924 films
Dutch silent feature films
Dutch black-and-white films
1924 drama films
Films about fishing
Dutch films based on plays
Films set in 1900
Dutch drama films
Silent drama films
Silent adventure films